Henry Atkins may refer to:
 Henry Atkins (designer) (1867–1923), designer and co-founder of the San Francisco, California art gallery Vickery, Atkins & Torrey
 Henry Atkins (physician) (1558–1635), English physician
 Henry Atkins, the fictional US Postmaster General character in Seinfeld in the episode "The Junk Mail"
 Sir Henry Atkins, 3rd Baronet of the Atkins baronets
 Sir Henry Atkins, 4th Baronet of the Atkins baronets
 Sir Henry Atkins, 5th Baronet (1726–1742)
 Henry B. Atkins (1867–1941), member of the Legislative Assembly of Alberta
 Henry Ernest Atkins (1872–1955), British chess player
 Henry A. Atkins (1827–1885), American businessman and mayor of Seattle
 Henry Atkins (speedway rider) (born 2001), English speedway rider